Eleutheros Cooke House may refer to:

Eleutheros Cooke House (1415 Columbus Avenue, Sandusky, Ohio), listed on the NRHP in Erie County, Ohio
Eleutheros Cooke House (410 Columbus Avenue, Sandusky, Ohio), also listed on the NRHP